Samuel Edward Troughton (born 27 March 1964 in Lisburn, Northern Ireland) is a Northern Irish former footballer who played as a forward and now a coach.

Playing career

Club
Troughton played for Glentoran and Wolverhampton Wanderers before coming to South Africa in 1985 to play for Jomo Cosmos, Mamelodi Sundowns and then Orlando Pirates. He was popularly known as "Special Branch" during his playing days in South Africa. In 1986, he briefly played for Crusaders, playing two league games in two days against Linfield and Glentoran (scoring in the latter) in December 1986.

Management career
After retiring from football, Troughton coached mainly lower league sides like Arcadia Shepherds, Pretoria University and Durban Stars. He also had a short stint as Orlando Pirates coach in 1994 and worked as an assistant coach for Free State Stars.

Troughton was retained as University of Pretoria manager for the start of the 2015–16 season. In March 2016, he took charge of Vasco da Gama for the rest of the season. On the 8 October 2018, Sammy signed a two-year deal as the Head Coach of Witbank Spurs, but barely two weeks after the joining the club he 
left for Mpumalanga rivals TS Sporting.

References 

1964 births
Living people
Jomo Cosmos F.C. players
Mamelodi Sundowns F.C. players
Sportspeople from Lisburn
Association football forwards
Football managers from Northern Ireland
Association footballers from Northern Ireland
Wolverhampton Wanderers F.C. players
Orlando Pirates F.C. players
Glentoran F.C. players
Crusaders F.C. players
British expatriates in South Africa
Expatriate soccer players in South Africa
Expatriate association footballers from Northern Ireland
Expatriate soccer managers in South Africa